Clinceni is a commune in the southwestern part of Ilfov County, Muntenia, Romania. It is composed of three villages: Clinceni, Olteni and Ordoreanu. The location hosts a small airport.

Currently, the village of Clinceni has the Guinness World Records for the biggest flag ever made. Previously, Lebanon was the country with this record.

Natives
 Vasile Paraschiv

References

Communes in Ilfov County
Localities in Muntenia